Desmiphora unicolor is a species of beetle in the family Cerambycidae. It was described by Stephan von Breuning in 1961. It is known from Brazil.

References

Desmiphora
Beetles described in 1961